Aggressive Link Power Management (ALPM) is a power management protocol for Advanced Host Controller Interface-compliant (AHCI) Serial ATA (SATA) devices, such as hard disk drives and solid-state drives.

Description
When enabled via the AHCI controller, this allows the SATA host bus adapter to enter a low-power state during periods of inactivity, thus saving energy. The drawback to this is increased periodic latency as the drive must be re-activated and brought back on-line before it can be used, and this will often appear as a delay to the end-user.

States
There are three states:
 Active
 Low Power with two internal states Partial and Slumber. Partial has a maximum return latency of 10 microseconds while slumber has a maximum latency of 10 milliseconds. The states can be initiated by Host (HIPM), Device (DIPM) or both. Hot swapping is disabled.
 Device Sleep with a maximum return latency of 20 milliseconds unless otherwise specified in Identify Data Log
These can be selected by the SATA AHCI driver, usually via a configuration option, or by the OS Power Options. Windows Vista and later allows the tweaking of AHCI LPM modes through a registry hack. Hot swapping is disabled.

See also 
 Energy Star
 Green computing
 Active State Power Management (ASPM)

References

External links 
 Aggressive Link Power Management - Red Hat
  - Intel

Aggressive Link Power Management
Aggressive Link Power Management
Serial ATA